Four Seasons Hotel Buenos Aires is a hotel in Retiro, Buenos Aires, Argentina.  It is part of Toronto-based Four Seasons Hotels and Resorts.

History
Constructed in 1992 as a Park Hyatt Hotel and renovated following its 2002 transfer, the Buenos Aires Four Seasons Hotel is a 12-floor main marble tower that combines contemporary and French styles.  The main tower was built overlooking a French Renaissance-styled mansion, which houses the suites; the hotel currently houses 165 guest rooms, including 49 suites. The Mansion was a wedding gift from Mr. Felix Alzaga Unzué to his wife Elena Peña in 1920, and remains one of the most architecturally significant mansions in the Recoleta area.

The mansion has a stone façade and Belle Époque style.

The hotel underwent a $49 million renovation that was completed in 2013.

External links
Official website

References

Hotels in Buenos Aires
Houses completed in 1920
Four Seasons hotels and resorts
Hotels established in 1992